WAJP (107.7 FM), "Radio Amigo" is an American radio station licensed to serve the community of Perry, Florida, USA. The station was assigned the call sign "WAJP" by the Federal Communications Commission (FCC) on August 26, 2009.

WAJP broadcasts a Regional Mexican format branded as "Radio Amigo". The station launched in late 2009 with the "Radio Amigo" Spanish language format but flipped to a country music format branded as "Bronco 107" in January 2011. A short time later the station went dark for unknown reasons.
In mid 2013 WAJP returned to the air and flipped back to Regional Mexican, now simulcasting 95.9 KUKY-FM in Yuma, AZ.

References

External links
Hispanic Target Media official website

AJP
Country radio stations in the United States
Taylor County, Florida
Radio stations established in 2009
2009 establishments in Florida